Finnish Reservist Sports Federation (RESUL) is the national sports federation for voluntary national defense organizations. It is a registered, non-profit organization operating in Finland, its headquarters located in Helsinki.

Mission 
The primary mission of RESUL is to maintain and develop the skills and abilities of its members:
 Physical fitness
 Field skills, including:
 Orienteering
 Shooting, see SRA-shooting
 Navigation
 Fire control
 Leadership
 Hiking

Organization 
The organization is directed by a board, headed by the chairman of the board. The board members represent the members organizations of the Federation:
 the Finnish Reservists' Association (FRA)
 the Finnish Reserve Officers’ Federation (FROF)
 Maanpuolustuskiltojen Liitto (MPKL)
Combined, the voluntary national defense organizations represent over 80.000 people in Finland.

Management team 
 President, Erkki Saarijärvi
 First Vice President, Mats Fagerlund
 Second Vice President, Harri Kastepohja
 Executive Director, Veli-Matti Kesälahti

History 
RESUL was founded in 12.12.1970. The founding organizations were Finnish NCO Association (later the Finnish Reservists' Association FRA), the Finnish Reserve Officers' Federation and all regional organizations thereof. In December 1998 RESUL became a member of National Defense Training Association (MPK), and re-joined the organization after it was re-organized in 01.01.2008.

See also 
 Norwegian Reserve Officers' Federation

References 

Shooting sports organizations
Sports organisations of Finland
1970 establishments in Finland